Lieutenant General Prayoon Pamornmontri was a Thai soldier, politician, and member of Khana Ratsadon (People's Party). He participated in the Siamese Revolution of 1932 to promote democracy by overthrowing the absolute monarchy.

Biography
Prayoon Thai father was Major Yam Pamornmontri; his mother was a physician, Annery Pamornmontri (nee. Feuer). His mother also taught German to many Siamese cadets in the German Empire at the time, many of whom later became members of the Khana Ratsadon.

Prayoon, as a child, served as a royal page to King Vajiravudh (Rama VI). When he grew up, he was appointed a royal guard. He resigned to study political science in Paris. While in Europe he traveled from Switzerland to Lyon to meet with fellow Siamese student, Khuang Aphaiwong. Khuang introduced him to Pridi Banomyong, the Paris-based leader of Siamese students in French.

In Paris, Pridi and Prayoon often spent their free time meeting in cafés or strolling the streets of Paris, talking about politics and the situation in Siam. This led to the creation of Khana Ratsadon, with Prayoon and Pridi as the first two members.

The first official meeting of Khana Ratsadon was held at rental no.9, Rue Du Sommerard on 5 February 1927, Prayoon's 30th birthday. His role in Khana Ratsadon was to contact and coordinate with other members.

After absolute monarchy was overthrown in Siam, he was appointed Minister of Education in the administration of Field Marshal Plaek Phibunsongkhram, the Prime Minister. After World War II, he was appointed Minister of Public Health (1954–1957). In the military, he founded the Volunteer Defense Corps (VDC) and ascended to the rank of lieutenant general.

He was elected as an MP for Chiang Mai as a member of the Seri Manangkasila Party in the February 1957 Thai general election.

Prayoon's youngest son is actor, singer, and politician Yuranunt "Sam" Pamornmontri.

Prayoon Pamornmontri died on 12 August 1982, aged 85, in a crash on a Bangkok city bus at Ratchaprasong Intersection.

Honours and awards

Civil Service of Siam rank
 Prefect of The Secretariat of The Cabinet of Siam

References

1898 births
1982 deaths
Prayoon Pamornmontri
Prayoon Pamornmontri
Prayoon Pamornmontri
Prayoon Pamornmontri
Prayoon Pamornmontri
Prayoon Pamornmontri
Prayoon Pamornmontri
Prayoon Pamornmontri
Road incident deaths in Thailand
Prayoon Pamornmontri
Prayoon Pamornmontri
Prayoon Pamornmontri
Prayoon Pamornmontri
Thai expatriates in Germany